William Augustus Newell (September 5, 1817August 8, 1901), was an American physician and politician, who was a three-term member of the United States House of Representatives, served as a Republican as the 18th governor of New Jersey, and as the 11th governor of the Washington Territory from 1880 to 1884. He is probably best known for, and was most proud of, the Newell Act, which created the United States Life-Saving Service (a federal agency that grew out of private and local humanitarian efforts to save the lives of shipwrecked mariners and passengers; which ultimately merged with the Revenue Cutter Service to form the United States Coast Guard in 1915).

Early life
Newell was born in Franklin, Ohio, the son of James Newell and Elisa Hankinson. His grandfather, Hugh Newell, came from Ireland in 1704. His parents, from old New Jersey families, moved back to New Jersey when he was two years old. He married Joanna VanDusen from New Brunswick. The marriage produced three sons and a daughter, with one son dying in early childhood. He graduated from Rutgers College in 1836an on-campus apartment complex at Cook College, the agricultural school of what is now Rutgers University, is named for himand from the University of Pennsylvania School of Medicine in 1839, and began to practice medicine in the Manahawkin section of Stafford Township, New Jersey, where he lived, and was one of the local volunteers for shipwrecks across Barnegat Bay. It was from the frustrating experience of watching a ship full of passengers perish because the volunteers could not reach them that he first thought of creating a life-saving service. He later moved to Allentown, New Jersey, which was to be his residence for the rest of his life.

Political life

First public office
The first office known to be held was that of tax collector for Upper Freehold Township, New Jersey. He reported in an interview to a reporter later in life to have said he "was never so proud of his life as when he received his certificate of that office"

Entering Congress
Newell was elected as a Whig to the Thirtieth and Thirty-first United States Congresses (March 4, 1847 – March 3, 1851), but did not run for re-election in 1850. It was during his first term that he authored the Newell Act. Under this Act, a series of light house stations were set up between Sandy Hook and Little Egg Harbor. Each station was equipped with a cannon that could shoot a line out to a ship for aiding in rescue efforts. The service was extended from Long Island to Cape May, and after rescuing 200 passengers and crewmembers from the Scottish brig Ayrshire, it was extended over the entire East Coast.

He also served on multiple committees. He served on the Foreign Affairs and Revolutionary Claims committees.

Governor
As the Whig party foundered, the opposition to the Democratic Party consisted of the new American party (also called the Know-Nothings), and the nascent Republican Party. The former stood for limiting immigrants' role in politics (primarily Irish Catholics at the time), while the latter was opposed to the extension of slavery to the territories. The parties united in an attempt to defeat the powerful Democratic party, and, as a former Whig who was also opposed the extension of slavery, Newell was nominated at a joint convention in 1856. He won by just 3,000 votes over Democratic candidate William C. Alexander, but the Democrats won most of the seats in the legislature.

As governor, he urged lower taxes and balanced budgets; improvements in the school system; stricter naturalization procedures; restrictions on suffrage of naturalized citizens; as well as improvements to education and to life-saving systems.  He worked hard to unite the American and Republican wings of the New Jersey Opposition

As governor he presided over the Court of Pardons, and in late 1857 was involved in a major controversy. James P. Donnelly, a medical student from a New York City Irish family was convicted of murdering Alfred S. Moses and sentenced to death in a Monmouth County court. To the Irish Catholics of New Jersey, this quickly became a large social and political issue, as he was convicted and sentenced by a Protestant judge and jury on what they saw as doubtful evidence. After Donnelly's appeals ran out, he sought commutation to a life sentence.  While the Court of Pardons voted 6 to 2 against a commutation, Newell claimed it had been a tie vote and that he cast the deciding vote for execution. This proved significant in Newell's political career later.

After the governorship
Newell attended the Republican National Conventions in 1860 and 1864. Abraham Lincoln appointed Newell to the Life-Saving Service of New Jersey, a position he held until he re-entered congress in 1865.  Newell was nominated for Congress in 1864 and won on a platform of support for the war. But in 1866 he was defeated, in part because of his strong anti-immigrant past and his role in the Donelly case. He returned to medicine, but unsuccessfully sought the nomination for Congress in 1868.  He did win the nomination in 1870 but lost the election. He ran for governor again in 1877, but lost to the popular Civil War general George B. McClellan. Again, his role in the Donnelly case was an issue, particularly in Irish Jersey City.

In 1880, President Rutherford B. Hayes appointed Newell to be the governor of Washington Territory. He supported many of the same policies he did while he was governor of New Jersey: strengthening life-saving systems on the Pacific Ocean, lower taxes, temperance, and forced acculturation of Native Americans. He served until 1884, and then was United States Indian inspector for a year. He then resumed the practice of medicine, this time in Olympia, and remained there 14 more years. While living in Olympia, he was elected mayor. Then, in 1899, at the age of 82, he returned to Allentown, continuing the practice of medicine, and took an active role in the Monmouth County Historical Association.

Death
He died at his home in Allentown at 11:45 a.m. August 8, 1901, and was interred in the Presbyterian Cemetery in Allentown. He was reportedly sick for several days. Following his death, Governor Voorhees draped the State House in Trenton, New Jersey, in black as a tribute of respect to him. He remained in state at the State House in Trenton for three days. He was then placed in a vault in Greenwood Cemetery. His only living child was in Italy at the time of his death. When his daughter returned, he was then removed and placed in Allentown Presbyterian Cemetery at his family plot.

References

Further reading
Available online through the Washington State Library's Classics in Washington History collection

External links

Biography of William A. Newell (PDF), New Jersey State Library
 New Jersey Governor William Augustus Newell, National Governors Association

William Augustus Newell at The Political Graveyard

1817 births
1901 deaths
People from Franklin, Ohio
American Presbyterians
New Jersey Whigs
Washington (state) Republicans
Governors of New Jersey
Governors of Washington Territory
Physicians from New Jersey
Rutgers University alumni
People from Allentown, New Jersey
People from Stafford Township, New Jersey
People of New Jersey in the American Civil War
Whig Party members of the United States House of Representatives
Republican Party members of the United States House of Representatives from New Jersey
Republican Party governors of New Jersey
Perelman School of Medicine at the University of Pennsylvania alumni
American people of Dutch descent
American people of Irish descent
19th-century American people
19th-century American politicians